Laura Imola Mikkola (born 3 February 1974 in Helsinki) is a Finnish pianist.

Laura Mikkola, having previously won Pretoria's UNISA TRANSNET and Helsinki's Maj Lind competitions, and been awarded the XII Paloma O'Shea Competition's contemporary music prize and a grant-prize, was second to Markus Groh at the XIII Queen Elisabeth Music Competition. She has performed internationally since the mid-90s.

There are a lot of CD recordings from different labels available (Naxos, ECM, BIS, René Gally, AEON, Cascavelle and Outhere). She is well known for her recordings of Einojuhani Rautavaara's Piano Concertos and piano works for Naxos Records.

In  2020, she has recorded the works of Svein Hundsnes and Légendes, the first monographic CD of the French composer David Chaillou for the label Fuga Libera. Légendes received the five stars of the RBB-Kultur (Berlin). She is also a leading interpreter of the piano works by the Finnish composer Einojuhani Rautavaara.

References

 Queen Elisabeth International Music Competition
 Naxos Records
 Official homepage

1974 births
Living people
Finnish classical pianists
Finnish women pianists
Prize-winners of the Queen Elisabeth Competition
21st-century classical pianists
21st-century women pianists